Princess Wensicia is a fictional character and member of House Corrino from the Dune universe created by Frank Herbert. She was introduced in Herbert's 1976 novel Children of Dune and appeared decades later in the 2008 novel Paul of Dune by Herbert's son Brian, and Kevin J. Anderson.

As established in the appendix of Dune (1965), Wensicia is the third daughter of the 81st Padishah Emperor Shaddam IV and Anirul, a Bene Gesserit of Hidden Rank. Her oldest sister is the Princess Irulan; her three other siblings are sisters Chalice, Josifa and Rugi. Wensicia accompanies her father into exile on Salusa Secundus after he is deposed by Paul Atreides in Dune.

Wensicia is portrayed by Susan Sarandon in the 2003 miniseries Frank Herbert's Children of Dune.

Children of Dune
In Children of Dune, Wensicia is described as "fair-haired" with a "heart-shaped face," and said to have learned "shifty trickiness" from her sister Irulan but not herself been trained by the Bene Gesserit.  She notes, "Irulan once divulged to me some of the things she'd learned. She was showing off at the time, and I saw no demonstrations. Still the evidence is pretty conclusive that Bene Gesserits have their ways of achieving their ends." Shaddam IV's heir is Wensicia's son Farad'n, whose deceased father, Dalak, is noted to be related to Count Hasimir Fenring, a close friend of Shaddam's since childhood.

As the novel begins, Shaddam is dead and Wensicia plots from exile to restore House Corrino to its former glory and wrest control of the Empire for Farad'n. She attempts to assassinate Leto II and Ghanima Atreides, the heirs to deceased Emperor Paul Atreides, by sending mechanically controlled Laza tigers to hunt them in the desert. Leto's growing prescience allows him to thwart the attack on himself and his twin sister; he pretends to be dead to escape the increasingly murderous ambitions of his father's sister Alia. Farad'n — newly trained in the Bene Gesserit ways by Paul and Alia's mother Lady Jessica — accepts an arrangement brokered by Jessica for him to marry Ghanima and share the throne; his part of the deal is to "denounce and banish" Wensicia for Leto's murder, which he does. Leto later returns and ascends the throne himself.

In adaptations
Wensicia is portrayed by Susan Sarandon in the Sci Fi Channel's 2003 miniseries Frank Herbert's Children of Dune, which is an adaptation of both Dune Messiah (1969) and its sequel Children of Dune. Sarandon told The New York Times, "One of the reasons I always loved the books was because they were driven by strong women, living outside the rules." She added that the Dune series "is very apropos to some of what's going on in the world today. It's about the dangers of fundamentalism and the idea that absolute power corrupts." The actress said of Wensicia, "She's just evil, evil, evil. I'm practically unrecognizable. It was a blast."

Laura Fries of Variety wrote, "it’s Susan Sarandon and Alice Krige [as Lady Jessica] who steal the thunder as opposing matriarchs of the great royal houses. Although the two never catfight, their ongoing struggle to rule the Dune dynasty gives this mini a real kick." Observing that Sarandon and Krige were "clearly relishing their roles", Fries added that "Sarandon makes a formidable enemy". Melanie McFarland of the Seattle Post-Intelligencer noted, "[Sarandon's] exiled princess may be the villain, cooking up deadly schemes, but we're right along with her in having a good time." Sarandon herself said, "it's always fun to play a smart villain." Not impressed overall with the acting in the miniseries, Ron Wertheimer of The New York Times wrote:

In the miniseries, Wensicia orchestrates the Dune Messiah conspiracy to assassinate Paul using a pre-programmed Tleilaxu ghola of his deceased friend Duncan Idaho, a plotline in which she is not involved in the novel. Emmet Asher-Perrin of Tor.com wrote:

Family tree

References

Dune (franchise) characters
Fictional princesses
Literary characters introduced in 1976